Mahdiyeh Metro Station is a station in line 3 of the Tehran Metro. It is located at the intersection of Valiasr Street and Molavi Street. The station will also serve Line 7, open on 14 July 2018, the date at which this station will also become operational.

References

Tehran Metro stations